Blessing Nsiegbe is a politician of the People's Democratic Party from Rivers State, Nigeria. She is a member of the House of Representatives of Nigeria from Port Harcourt II federal constituency. She won election into the federal house of representatives in 2015 but it went to the election tribunal. The election was upheld in 2016 and she was declared winner.

References

Living people
People from Port Harcourt (local government area)
Members of the House of Representatives (Nigeria) from Rivers State
Peoples Democratic Party members of the House of Representatives (Nigeria)
Nigerian women in politics
Members of the House of Representatives (Nigeria)
Year of birth missing (living people)